The Carius halogen method in analytical chemistry is a method for the quantitative determination of halogens in chemical substances.

A known mass of an organic compound is heated with fuming nitric acid in the presence of silver nitrate contained in a hard glass tube known as carius tube, in a furnace. Carbon and hydrogen present in the compound are oxidised to carbon dioxide and water. The halogen present forms the corresponding silver halide (AgX). It is filtered, washed, dried and weighed.

This chemical test works equally well for the determination of sulfur but without addition of silver nitrate. The sulfuric acid intermediate formed after reaction of sulfur with fuming nitric acid forms insoluble barium sulfate on addition of barium chloride. The purpose of adding the nitric acid is to oxidise the carbon and hydrogen. Concentrated nitric acid only oxidises iodine to iodic acid and doesn't affect any other halogens. Even the oxidation of iodine by concentrated nitric acid happens only at high temperatures.

This test was invented by the German Chemist, Georg Ludwig Carius (1829–1875).

References

Chemical tests
Elemental analysis